The Podujevo massacre is the name generally used to refer to the killing of 14 Kosovo Albanian civilians, mostly women and children, committed in March 1999 by the Scorpions, a Serbian paramilitary organisation in conjunction with the Special Anti-Terrorist Unit of Serbia, during the Kosovo War. One of the survivors of this massacre, Saranda Bogujevci, 13 years old when it occurred, received mass media attention after she successfully managed to bring to justice her case with the help of several organizations from Serbia, Canada, and the United Kingdom.

Aftermath
Goran Stoparić, at the time of the events serving in the Anti-Terrorism Unit (SAJ), gave evidence to bring the culprits to justice. In an interview to Canadian Broadcasting Corporation, he speculated over the motives behind the actions committed by the irregular forces: 

"In my opinion, [their] only motive was the fact that the victims were Albanians, and perhaps because of some hidden immaturity or sickness of mind on their part. They would probably have killed them had they been Bosnians or Croats. But it is certain that they were killed because they were not Serbs."

Serbian police arrested two members of a paramilitary unit called the Scorpions, Saša Cvjetan and Dejan Demirović, who freely gave incriminating statements and signed them. Demirović had moved to Canada and applied for political asylum but was deported back to his home country after a campaign orchestrated by human rights organizations.

Demirović and Cvjetan were the only two people charged with the killings. Cvjetan was sentenced in Serbia to 20 years in prison.

On 10 April 2007, four members of the Scorpions paramilitary group were convicted and sentenced to lengthy prison sentences by Belgrade's War Crimes Court.

See also 

 List of massacres in Yugoslavia
 List of massacres in the Kosovo War
 War crimes in Kosovo
 Battle of Podujevo

References

External links
Massacre described at Kosovo war crimes trial, Associated Press/Fox News Channel, December 11, 2008

Podujevo
Serbian war crimes in the Kosovo War
Massacres in the Kosovo War
1999 crimes in Kosovo
Massacres in 1999
Anti-Albanian sentiment
Mass shootings in Kosovo
Mass shootings in Serbia